Roushan Ershad (born 19 July 1943) is a  Bangladesh Jatiya Party politician. She is the current Jatiya Sangsad member from Mymensingh-4 constituency and the incumbent Leader of the Opposition in the 11th parliament. She is the Chief Patron  of the Jatiya Party (Ershad) and the widow of former Bangladesh president Hussain Muhammad Ershad.

Political career
As the First Lady during 1982–1990, Ershad was active in social welfare and in promoting the rights of women and children. She was the chief patron of the Bangladesh Jatiya Mohila Sangstha.

In 1975, Ershad became the founder-president of the Sena Paribar Kalliyan Samity (Armed Forces Family Welfare Association). She attended the UN Special Convention on Drug Abuse in 1985.

Personal life
Roushan married Hussain Muhammad Ershad in 1956. Together they had a son, Saad Ershad, and also a daughter, Jebin.

References

External links

Living people
1943 births
People from Mymensingh District
Jatiya Party politicians
21st-century Bangladeshi women politicians
Women members of the Jatiya Sangsad
Leaders of the Opposition (Bangladesh)
Women opposition leaders
Health and Family Welfare ministers of Bangladesh
8th Jatiya Sangsad members
10th Jatiya Sangsad members
11th Jatiya Sangsad members
Place of birth missing (living people)